Santiago Xanica Zapotec is a Zapotec language of Oaxaca, Mexico.

References

External links 

 Zapotec Survey from Santiago Xanica in the Archive of the Indigenous Languages of Latin America

Zapotec languages